William Blair (born 11 March 1872) was a Scottish footballer who played as a left half for Greenock Morton, Third Lanark and Scotland. He was also an accomplished rower.

References

Sources

External links

1872 births
Year of death missing
Scottish footballers
Scotland international footballers
Greenock Morton F.C. players
Third Lanark A.C. players
Footballers from Greenock
Scottish Football League players
Association football wing halves